Louis Pichot de Champfleury is a Général de division of the French Army and Commandant of the Foreign Legion.

Military career

Louis was admitted to Saint-Cyr in September 1974, promotion « Lieutenant Élisée Alban Darthenay ».
Sous-lieutenant on August 8, 1976, he chose at his sortie to serve in the metropolis infantry option ALAT and joined in September 1976, the school of infantry application.

Lieutenant on August 1, 1977, he was assigned the 2nd Foreign Regiment 2e RE at Bonifacio as a combat section chief and participated to a turning company at Mayotte and to Operation Tacaud in Tchad.

In September 1979, he joined the 2ème REP in quality of a combat section chief, then ordinary officer the following year.

In June 1981, he was assigned to the 5e RMP, in quality as a detachment chief regimental security officer. He was promoted to Captain on August 1, 1981.

Following his end of tour, he joined in August 1982 the 4th Foreign Regiment 4e RE. Platoon chief of the 1st degree of the preparatory technical certificate, he passed to assistant, then assumed the commandment of this unit in July 1984 after having undergone the infantry captain course from August to December 1983.

In August 1986, he assumed simultaneously the functions of assistant chief of the instruction bureau and high conduit officer at the second operational center of the general staff headquarters merged from the EAI/14th Light Armored Division.
He joined the functional bureau during the last year as a quality operation officer. He was then nominated as Chef de batailllon on July 1, 1987.

He was admitted as a quality candidate to the 103rd promotion at the superior war school in Paris in September 1989. Designated to follow this course in Great Britain, he was issued a diploma from the Camberley Staff College in 1990.

In June 1991, he occupied the functions of bureau chief of SIRPA at Paris.

Lieutenant-colonel on July 1, 1991.

In July 1993, he joined Canada to assume the post of course director of the command and general staff headquarters college of the Canadian Armed Forces in Toronto. Upon his return, in September 1995, he was assigned to the general staff headquarters of the French Army EMAT at Paris. He was in charge of responses to parliamentary inquiries and follow-ups of the accounting audit courts as an officer editor at the planning finance bureau.

On August 2, 1997, he was designated as the regimental commander of the 4er RE. Colonel on October 1 199. During two years, he ensured, the increase composition of the future 2ème REG by creating two combat companies while leading the creation of a new instruction center destined to the formation of legionnaires at the corps of the regiment's formation.

In August 1999, he was assigned at Aubagne in quality as a chief in the general staff headquarters of the Foreign Legion, a post which he left in July 2001 to join his new posting in Paris, in order to assume the task functions of the assistant chief bureau of AC-RS of the DPMAT.

Général de brigade on July 16, 2006, he assumed the command of the Legion on the same date.

Military governor of Marseille and officer general of the southern defense zone as of July 2, 2009.

He was admitted in the 2nd section of officers generals on August 31, 2011, and promoted to Général de division on the same date.

Recognitions and Honors 

  Officier of the Légion d'honneur
  Chevalier of the Légion d'honneur
  Chevalier de l'ordre national du Mérite
  Croix de la Valeur militaire (cited at the orders of the brigade)
  Croix du combatant
  Medaille d'Outre-Mer (agrafe « Tchad ») 
  Médaille de la Défense nationale

See also 

Major (France)
Music of the Foreign Legion (MLE)

References

Sources 
 Répertoire des chefs de corps
 Centre de documentation de la Légion étrangère
 Répertoire des citations (BCAAM)

1954 births
French Army officers
Living people